Paimpalasseri is a small town in Kozhikode district in the Indian state of Kerala. Situated on Kunnamangalam-Nanminda Road or Kappad-Thusharagiri-Adivaram Road and is about 20 km away from Kozhikode city. There are two roads starting from Paimpalasseri. One is Paimpalasseri-Madavoor mukku road and the other is Paimpalasseri-Pullaloor road. Important educational institutions in Paimpalassery are Madavoor Upper primary school and Paimpalasseri government lower primary school. Sri Mahavishnu temple located in Paimpalasseri is the one of the famous temples in Kozhikode district.

References

Villages in Kozhikode district
Kozhikode east